is a Japanese animation studio subsidiary of animation production company Twin Engine.

Establishment
In 2015, previous Fuji TV's Noitamina producer Kōji Yamamoto established the studio after he founded his own production company, Twin Engine, in 2014. Geno Studio is a complete subsidiary of Twin Engine, and most of its staff came from the now defunct studio Manglobe.

Works

Television series

OVAs
Golden Kamuy (2018–2020, 4 episodes)

Films
Genocidal Organ (2017, taken over from Manglobe)

ONAs
Star Wars: Visions - Lop & Ochō (2021)

References

External links
  
 

Animation studios in Tokyo
Japanese animation studios
Japanese companies established in 2015
Mass media companies established in 2015